Jugon may refer to:

Jugon-les-Lacs, a place in Brittany
Jugon, Japanese name of the Pokémon Dewgong